Fight Back to School 2 is a 1992 Hong Kong comedy film directed by Gordon Chan and starring Stephen Chow, Ng Man-Tat and Cheung Man. It is a sequel to the 1991 film Fight Back to School.

As per the original Fight Back to School, this film is set in 2 schools in Hong Kong: Shatin College and Chinese International School.

Plot
Star Chow (Stephen Chow) is an officer in the Royal Hong Kong Police's elite Special Duties Unit (SDU). During a meeting with his senior officer, Inspector Yip (Deanie Ip), Star jokingly suggests he wish to be reassigned to the traffic unit.

Star immediately finds himself demoted to Constable engaging in traffic duty on the streets of Hong Kong. After being made the scapegoat for a failed high school terrorist investigation, Star hastily resigns from the police.

He decides to enrol at the high school to launch his own private investigation. But Star realises the investigation will not be easy when he discovers that the bumbling, incompetent CID detective Tat (Ng Man Tat) is also undercover at the high school.

Cast and roles
 Stephen Chow - Chow Sing Sing
 Cheung Man - Miss Ho
 Ng Man-tat
 Athena Chu - Sandy Lai
 Deanie Ip
 Michael Chow - Undercover student
 Cheung Chi-Kwong - Maths teacher
 Michael Dingo - Peter
 Mark Houghton - Terrorist
 Jonathan Isgar - Terrorist
 Mark King - Terrorist
 Blackie Ko - Belligerent hood
 Spencer Lam - Judo Teacher
 Gabriel Wong
 Sarah Lee
 Indra Leech
 Tam Sin-Hung
 John Wakefield
 Wong Jim
 Sen Wong

Alternative versions
The Taiwanese DVD release from Scholar contains 17 minutes of extended footage:
 An 11-minute flashback of the first film in Mandarin without any English subtitles.
 Stephen Chow pushing the bus.
 Extended scene of Stephen Chow and the principal of the school sit down on a chair.
 The sequence where Stephen is on a cross of Jesus Christ had been removed from the Taiwanese version for the sake of pacing.
 Extended extra scene of Chow coming towards Sandy in the sports area then her sister drags her to play tennis.
 Chow and Sharla Cheung look for a new apartment. Chow senses something suspicious between his girlfriend and Sharla also senses that Chow is hiding something away from her which explains why in the end of the movie Sharla Cheung gets the maths teacher for a boyfriend.
 An extended scene of Sandy and her sister talk about chow in the cafeteria scene.
 The scene of Stephen forced to go home by his fake mother who is a cop. There is an alternate shorter scene when Stephen gets expelled by Ng Man Tat and an extended scene of him walking down the stairs.
 The battle sequence at the school is shorter in the Taiwanese version.
 The montage at the end of the film is more than five minutes long and has a different music soundtrack.

The original director's cut contains a scene where during the sequence where Chow punches right through a basketball right before Ng Man Tat is shown holding a yellow ruler and playing with it and an extended scene during the roll call scene with Stephen Chow and his classmate admiring him this part can be shown at the extended montage at the end of the film.

References

External links
 

1992 films
1992 comedy films
1990s Cantonese-language films
Hong Kong sequel films
Films set in Hong Kong
Films directed by Gordon Chan
Hong Kong comedy films
1990s Hong Kong films